Umburanas is a municipality in the state of Bahia in the North-East region of Brazil. The municipality is located within the caatinga ecoregion. Umburanas borders on five municipalities: Ourolândia, Mirangaba, Campo Formoso, Morro do Chapéu, and Sento Sé, all in the state of Bahia.

See also
List of municipalities in Bahia

References

Municipalities in Bahia